The men's 4 × 400 metres relay event at the 1959 Pan American Games was held at the Soldier Field in Chicago on 1 and 2 September.

Medallists

Results

Heats

Final

References

Athletics at the 1959 Pan American Games
1959